Irmgard Kärner (20 February 1927 – 23 August 2014), also Irmgard Karner, was a German chess player. She was a winner the West Germany Women's Chess Championship (1964).

Biography
From the 1960s to the early 1970s, Irmgard Kärner was one of the leading chess players in the West Germany. She won four medals in West Germany Women's Chess Championships: gold (1964), two silver (1965, 1970) and bronze (1962).

Irmgard Kärner played for West Germany in the Women's Chess Olympiads:
 In 1966, at first reserve board in the 3rd Chess Olympiad (women) in Oberhausen (+0, =1, -5),
 In 1969, at first reserve board in the 4th Chess Olympiad (women) in Lublin (+3, =2, -4),
 In 1972, at second board in the 5th Chess Olympiad (women) in Skopje (+4, =2, -2).

Irmgard Kärner played chess until old age. She twice won the third place at the German Women's Senior Championship (1996, 2002). In 2000, Irmgard Kärner shared 1st place in German Women's Senior Championship.

References

Literature 
 Michael Dombrowsky: Vor 50 Jahren: Zwei denkwürdige Schacholympiaden from ChessBase
 In Dresden ist die Welt am Zug! from schacholympiade.org

Other sources 
 Bulletin of 18. German Women's Championship, Bremen 27.9. – 10.10.1964
 Deutsche Meisterschaften der Frauen from TeleSchach
 Der Schachclub Starnberg trauert um Irmgard Karner from SC Starnberg

External links

Irmgard Kärner chess games at 365Chess.com
Irmgard Karner from German Chess Federation

1927 births
2014 deaths
German female chess players
Chess Olympiad competitors